Eunice is a city in Lea County, New Mexico, United States. The population was 2,922 at the 2010 census.

Description
The mayor of Eunice, as of March 2018, was Billy Hobbs.

Geography
Eunice is located in southeastern Lea County at  (32.440005, -103.162514). It is bypassed to the east by New Mexico State Road 18, which leads north  to Hobbs, the largest city in the county, and south  to Jal. State Road 176 runs east-west through the center of Eunice.

Demographics

As of the census of 2000, there were 2,562 people, 942 households, and 709 families residing in the city. The population density was 877.5 people per square mile (338.8/km2). There were 1,110 housing units at an average density of 380.2 per square mile (146.8/km2). The racial makeup of the city was 71.00% White, 1.09% African American, 0.43% Native American, 0.12% Asian, 24.43% from other races, and 2.93% from two or more races. Hispanic or Latino of any race were 39.62% of the population.

There were 942 households, out of which 38.3% had children under the age of 18 living with them, 60.0% were married couples living together, 9.0% had a female householder with no husband present, and 24.7% were non-families. 22.9% of all households were made up of individuals, and 11.4% had someone living alone who was 65 years of age or older. The average household size was 2.72 and the average family size was 3.20.

In the city, the population was spread out, with 29.5% under the age of 18, 11.1% from 18 to 24, 27.2% from 25 to 44, 19.4% from 45 to 64, and 12.8% who were 65 years of age or older. The median age was 34 years. For every 100 females, there were 100.2 males. For every 100 females age 18 and over, there were 101.0 males.

The median income for a household in the city was $31,722, and the median income for a family was $38,808. Males had a median income of $30,216 versus $21,400 for females. The per capita income for the city was $14,373. About 14.2% of families and 15.6% of the population were below the poverty line, including 18.4% of those under age 18 and 10.1% of those age 65 or over.

Education
The school district is Eunice Municipal Schools.

Sports
Eunice high school baseball has produced 17 state championships. This record ranks fifth in the nation.

Childhood Home of Josh Lynn

See also

 List of municipalities in New Mexico

References

External links

 
 

Cities in New Mexico
Cities in Lea County, New Mexico